Arthur Ashe was the defending champion of the singles event at the ABN World Tennis Tournament, but did not participate in this edition.

Second-seeded Tom Okker won the title, defeating Third-seeded Tom Gorman in the final, 6–3, 6–4.

Seeds

Draw

Finals

Upper half

Lower half

References

External links
 ITF tournament edition details

1974 ABN World Tennis Tournament